Charles Albert Pickett (March 1, 1883 – May 20, 1969) was a pitcher in Major League Baseball. He played for the St. Louis Cardinals in 1910.

References

External links

1883 births
1969 deaths
Major League Baseball pitchers
St. Louis Cardinals players
Baseball players from Ohio
Lima Cigarmakers players
Terre Haute Stags players
Bloomington Bloomers players
Springfield Senators players
Madison Senators players